Rahi is a village and corresponding community development block in Rae Bareli district, Uttar Pradesh, India. It is located 7 km from Rae Bareli, the district headquarters, which according to one folk etymology is named after the village. Rahi was formerly the seat of a pargana before Rae Bareli replaced it in that capacity. As of 2011, Rahi has a population of 7,536 people, in 1,373 households. It has one primary school and one medical clinic.

The 1961 census recorded Rahi as comprising 10 hamlets, with a total population of 2,950 people (1,664 male and 1,286 female), in 617 households and 576 physical houses. The area of the village was given as 1,708 acres and it had a post office at that point. It had one grain mill and 3 makers of jewellery and/or precious metal items.

The 1981 census recorded Rahi as having a population of 4,611 people, in 951 households, and having an area of 363.30 hectares. The main staple foods were given as wheat and rice.

Villages
Rahi CD block has the following 106 villages:

References

Villages in Raebareli district
Community development blocks in India